Alessandro Di Robilant (born 23 October 1953) is an Italian film director and screenwriter. He has directed eleven films since 1985. His 1994 film Law of Courage was entered into the 44th Berlin International Film Festival where it won the Blue Angel Award.

He is a graduate of the London Film School

Filmography
 Anche lei fumava il sigaro (1985)
 Il nodo alla cravatta (1991)
 Law of Courage (1994)
 Vite blindate (1998) - TV film
 Un paese di sportivi (1998) - Documentary
 I fetentoni (1999)
 La voce nel sangue (1999) - TV film
 Forever (2003)
 L'uomo della carità (2007) - TV film
 Marpiccolo (2009)
 Mauro c'ha da fare (2013)

References

External links

1953 births
Living people
Italian film directors
Italian screenwriters
Italian male screenwriters
Alumni of the London Film School